Shelok Dolma also called Xi Luozhuoma or Xiluo Zhuo Ma (born October 24, 1987) is a Tibetan female wrestler from China.

Biography 
Dolma was born in the Tibetan region of Nyingrtri in Kongpo. She first started wrestling for China in 2010 where she participated in the World Wrestling competition in Turkey. In 2011, she won the gold medal for Women's Freestyle Wrestling in the 67 kg class. This marked the first time a Tibetan woman won the international wrestling gold medal. Six months prior to her win in Turkey, she won the silver medal at the National Wrestling Championship. Her win in 2011 qualified her for the 2012 London Olympics.

While at Beijing Sport University, she was awarded "Chinese College Student of the Year 2012."

In 2013, she won the gold medal in Shenyang city for the 63 kg wrestling event at the 12th National Games of China.

Dolma won a gold medal again at the Asian Wrestling Championships in 2015 which took place at the Aspire Dome in Doha, Qatar.

References

External links
 bio on fila-wrestling.com

Living people
1987 births
Chinese female sport wrestlers
Asian Games medalists in wrestling
Wrestlers at the 2014 Asian Games
World Wrestling Championships medalists
Asian Games silver medalists for China
Medalists at the 2014 Asian Games
Asian Wrestling Championships medalists